Ahmed Mufleh Nawaf Al-Hourani is a Jordanian footballer who plays for Al-Ahli. 
 
Ahmed has a younger brother named Mahmoud who also plays football.

References

External links 
 

1991 births
Living people
Jordanian footballers
Jordan youth international footballers
Association football forwards
Al-Ramtha SC players
Ittihad Al-Ramtha players
Al-Faisaly SC players
Mansheyat Bani Hasan players
Kufrsoum SC players
Al-Baqa'a Club players
Al-Sareeh SC players
Al-Ahli SC (Amman) players
Jordanian Pro League players